Vittaya Samrej (born 18 February 1964) is a Thai tennis coach and former professional player. As of 2020 he is team captain of Thailand's Davis Cup team.

Samrej had a record 18-year long Davis Cup career playing for Thailand, featuring in 37 ties between 1985 and 2002, mostly as a doubles specialist. He won 21 doubles rubbers in total, which is a former Thai record. His two singles wins both came in a 1997 tie against Hong Kong.

A regular participant in the Southeast Asian Games, Samrej has won numerous medals, including three doubles gold medals. He won a further four gold medals for his country in the team event.

Samrej won a team bronze medal at the 1986 Asian Games, then a mixed doubles bronze at the 1990 Asian Games.

His son, Kasidit Samrej, is a Davis Cup player for Thailand.

References

External links
 
 
 

1964 births
Living people
Vittaya Samrej
Tennis players at the 1986 Asian Games
Tennis players at the 1990 Asian Games
Tennis players at the 1994 Asian Games
Tennis players at the 2002 Asian Games
Medalists at the 1986 Asian Games
Medalists at the 1990 Asian Games
Vittaya Samrej
Asian Games medalists in tennis
Southeast Asian Games medalists in tennis
Vittaya Samrej
Vittaya Samrej
Vittaya Samrej
Competitors at the 1987 Southeast Asian Games
Competitors at the 1991 Southeast Asian Games
Competitors at the 1993 Southeast Asian Games
Competitors at the 1995 Southeast Asian Games
Competitors at the 1997 Southeast Asian Games
Competitors at the 1999 Southeast Asian Games
Competitors at the 2001 Southeast Asian Games